This is a list of the European Music & Media magazine's European Hot 100 Singles and European Top 100 Albums number-ones of 1993.

See also
 1993 in music
 List of number-one hits in Europe

1993 record charts
Lists of number-one albums in Europe
Lists of number-one songs in Europe